El Castillo de los monstruos (Spanish for 'The castle of the monsters') is a 1958 Mexican horror comedy directed by Julián Soler.

Plot 
Mexican funnyman, El Clavillazo (Antonio Espino), is in love with a seamstress named Beatriz (Evangelina Elizondo) and also hangs out with a variety of odd characters, including a newsboy and a mental patient. Meanwhile, a mad scientist named Dr. Sputnik and his scarred, hunchbacked assistant are busy making monsters at the nearby castle. The doctor poses as a kindly blind man in town and uses hypnosis to lure Beatriz to his castle, brainwashing her into believing that she is his own love named Galatea. El Clavillazo, with an assist from his friends, blunders his way into the castle, where he spends most of his time being chased around by various monsters. There is the butler, who looks like the Frankenstein Monster. The other monsters include a werewolf, a mummy, a vampire (clearly modeled after Count Dracula), and a gill-man (clearly patterned after Creature from the Black Lagoon). There is also another unidentified monster being kept in a cell (why it is not allowed to run free with the rest is unknown), referred to as a “gorilla” in some reviews. However, it appears to be more of a humanoid ape-like creature, perhaps based on Dr. Jekyll and Mr. Hyde. In the end, El Clavillazo manages to defeat the monsters, mostly by luck, and rescue the girl. A chemical in Sputnik’s lab devolves the gill-man into a big fish, the werewolf is choked out by the monster in the cell (perhaps that is why he was kept behind bars), Frankenstein accidentally electrocutes himself by grabbing a power cable in the lab and turns into cogs and clock-parts, the mummy falls into a pit of alligators and is devoured, and the vampire vanishes when the sun rises. Dr. Sputnik has the usual falling out that all mad scientists seem to eventually have with their deformed assistants (usually due to the scientist mistreating his assistant, or the assistant developing a crush on a girl the scientist has designs on, or sometimes a combination of both), resulting in his being shot after he stabs the scarred hunchback. Clavillazo and Beatriz are trapped in a room and about to be crushed by the walls moving together when they are rescued in the nick of time by the rest of the gang, and they all live happily ever after.

Cast
 Antonio "Clavillazo" Espino as Clavillazo
 Evangelina Elizondo as Beatriz
 Carlos Orellana as Don Melchor
 Guillermo Orea as El Cojo
 Germán Robles as El Vampiro
 José Muñoz (as Jose Muñoz Wilhelmy)
 Jose Moreno Camacho
 Alejandro Reyna as Licenciado (as Alejandro Reyna Garcia)
 Leopoldo Pineda (as Leopoldo Pineda Magaña)
 Fernando Shewan

References

External links

 

1958 films
1958 horror films
Mummy films
Frankenstein films
Mexican vampire films
Mexican comedy horror films
Mexican werewolf films
Mexican black-and-white films
Mexican science fiction films
1950s comedy horror films
1958 comedy films
Films set in castles
1950s Mexican films